The Manhattan Community Board 12 is a New York City community board for the neighborhoods of Inwood and Washington Heights in the borough of Manhattan. It is delimited by the Harlem River on the east and on the north, the Hudson River on the west and 155th Street on the south.

Demographics
As of 2000, the Community Board had a population of 208,414, up from 198,192 in 1990, and 179,141 in 1980. Of the population (as of 2000), 28,242 (13.6%) are White non Hispanic, 17,480 (8.4%) are African-American, 4,310 (2.1%) Asian or Pacific Islander, 505 (0.2%) American Indian or Native Alaskan, 727 (0.3%) of some other race, 2,736 (1.3%) of two or more race, 154,414 (74.1%) of Hispanic origins. As of 2009, 42.3% of the population benefit from public assistance, which was up from 33.3% in 2000.

References

External links
www.cb12manhattan.com

Community boards of Manhattan